ITV3 is a British free-to-air television channel owned by ITV Digital Channels, a division of ITV plc. The channel was first launched on Monday 1 November 2004 at 9pm, replacing Plus (Granada). ITV3 is the sixth-largest UK television channel by audience share and the largest after the five main terrestrial services, the position which was previously held by its sister station ITV2. The channel is known for repeats of ITV dramas, and including sequential reruns of Agatha Christie's Poirot, Classic Coronation Street, Classic Emmerdale, Heartbeat, Inspector Morse and A Touch of Frost, amongst others.

History
ITV3 was launched on the terrestrial (Freeview), cable (NTL and Telewest), broadband (HomeChoice) and digital satellite (Sky) on 1 November 2004 at 9:00pm, with the UKTV premiere of Ian Rankin's Rebus. It is also available on TalkTalk TV IPTV and Freesat.

ITV3 was originally conceived as 'ITV Gold', when ITV was looking to maximise their multichannel presence due to the growth of digital TV and the Freeview platform, but was faced with lack of space on the Sky platform due to technical limitations and the rights to certain ITV programmes being held by GSkyB, a joint venture run by ITV and Sky which operated a suite of pay TV channels. ITV took full control of Granada Sky Broadcasting, and ceased broadcasting the Granada Plus channel, thereby allowing ITV3 to take the channel number, bandwidth, and programme rights, meaning all platforms could receive the channel from launch. ITV3 was also the only channel in the ITV brand not to simulcast CITV breakfast, until ITV launched two channels in 2014, ITVBe and ITV Encore.

The channel had been available from launch on UPC Ireland, but was withdrawn on 22 March 2006. This is believed to have been at the request of ITV plc, which had previously barred Irish newspapers from publishing details of ITV channels and regions other than UTV and Men & Motors. The channel had already been (and remains) available to Irish viewers on free-to-air satellite for some time, however it has not been listed in the Sky electronic programme guide since its removal on 25 January 2006. ITV3 returned to UPC Ireland in the Republic of Ireland on 4 January 2010.

As Freeview announced plans for a retune on 30 September 2009, ITV3 moved to an alternative multiplex. Viewers in areas that have completed switchover who receive their signal from a local relay transmitter not carrying the commercial multiplexes were no longer be able to receive ITV3. It was moved back on 28 March 2018.

On 1 April 2011, ITV3 was removed from UPC Ireland along with ITV2 and ITV4 due to the expiry of a carriage agreement between UPC and ITV. UPC Ireland claim that ITV is not in a position to renegotiate the deal because ITV had struck a deal with another channel provider to provide it with exclusive rights to air certain content from the channels. Conversely, UPC Ireland also claims to have been in discussions right up to the last moment in order to continue broadcasting the channels. ITV2, ITV3 and ITV4 were restored to the UPC Ireland line-up on 20 December 2011. TV3 and its sister channel 3e already hold carriage agreement to air certain ITV content within the Republic of Ireland, alternatively UTV is available within the Republic. ITV2 is available along with ITV3 and ITV4 within Switzerland, all three channels are available on SwisscomTV and UPC Cablecom. ITV3 is registered to broadcast within the European Union/EEA through ALIA in Luxembourg.

It was announced by ITV on 20 September 2017 that reruns of classic episodes of Coronation Street will air twice on weekdays. The repeat run began on 2 October 2017 with the episodes originally broadcast on 15 and 20 January 1986. The episodes air from 2:40 pm on weekday afternoons and are repeated at 6:00 am the following day (except Friday's episodes, which are repeated on the following Monday). 

To mark the 60th Anniversary of Coronation Street between 7 and 11 December 2020 at 10:00pm-11:05 pm ITV3 re-aired special episodes of the soap including: Episode 1 (Coronation Street), the tenth anniversary episode from December 1970, two episodes from the twentieth anniversary in December 1980, two episodes from the thirtieth anniversary in December 1990, the Coronation Street Live (2000 episode) from the fortieth anniversary in December 2000, and the fiftieth anniversary episode Coronation Street Live (2010 episode) which was re-transmitted after a repeat of The Road to Coronation Street. 

On 18 April 2022 Easter Monday, at 10:25am until 2:35pm. Eight special Coronation Street episodes featuring Ken Barlow, were shown to mark the upcoming 90th birthday of William Roache. The episodes shown were ''Episode 1 from December 1960, Ken and Deirdre Tie the Knot from July 1981, Ken's Affair from December 1989, Deirdre's Fling from January 2003, Steve and Karen's Wedding Shocker from February 2004, Ken and Deirdre's Second Wedding from April 2005. Ken and Deirdre's Holiday from August 2014, and  Deirdre's Death from July 2015.

It was announced by ITV on 5 January 2019 that reruns of classic episodes of Emmerdale will air twice on weekdays. Two classic episodes were retransmitted between Mondays to Fridays at 1:45 pm until 2:40 pm from 21 January 2019.They are repeated at 7:00 am the following day (except Friday's episodes, which are repeated on the following Monday) The reruns began with episode 1403 (originally shown on 14 November 1989) which was when the title changed from Emmerdale Farm to Emmerdale.

To mark the 50th Anniversary of Emmerdale between 17 and 21 October 2022 at 10:00pm-12:05 am ITV3 re-aired special episodes of the soap including: Episode 1 from October 1972, The Train Crash resulting in the deaths of the Skilbeck twins from January 1976, The two episodes of The Mine Explosion from March 1978, Pat Sugden is killed in a car crash from August 1986. The Crossgill Fire and aftermath of Annie Sugden's rescue from May 1988. The Plane Crash episodes from December 1993. Biff and Linda Fowler's Wedding and the following episode resulting in The Death of Dave Glover from December 1996. The New Year Storm resulting in The Woolpack collapsing on Tricia Dingle from January 2004, Zoe Tate's exit and Home Farm is blown up from September 2005. The 40th Anniversary Live Episode from October 2012. Ending with the episodes Debbie and Pete Barton's Wedding, The Helicopter Crash and Death of Val Pollard from August 2015.

On 7 October 2022, the ITV3 Facebook account is due to be replaced by a new ITVX Facebook page in order to streamline the ITV channels for an upcoming rebrand.

Crime Thriller Awards
The ITV3 Crime Thriller Awards were first held on 3 October 2008, and were broadcast on ITV3 three days later. ITV3 controller Emma Tennant devised the awards to "cement ITV3's reputation as the home of great storytelling and, in particular, great crime thrillers". In 2009, the awards were merged with the Crime Writers' Association Daggers.

Subsidiary channels

ITV3 +1

ITV launched a one-hour timeshift channel of ITV3 on Monday 30 October 2006, it was allocated channel number 213. The channel number was moved a few years later. ITV2 +1 was launched on the same day.

This channel is often unable to broadcast certain programmes "for legal reasons", but the programme in question might still be listed on the EPG. The channel launched on Freeview on 15 October 2013 using downtime from ITV-owned shopping channel The Store. Initially on Freeview, ITV3 +1 broadcast from 01:00 till 06:00 – these hours were extended and brought forward in February 2014, now airing from 18:00 till 00:00 in the higher EPG slot of channel 34. On 25 August 2015, ITV3 +1 extended its hours on Freeview to 18:00 till 06:00 and then in March 2016 it went back to closing at midnight. Due to the launch of new channel Merit, ITV3 +1 moved to channel 58 on Freeview swapping with ITVBe +1 which moved to channel 97.

ITV3 HD

A high-definition simulcast of ITV3, ITV3 HD, was launched on 15 November 2010 alongside the sister channel, ITV4 HD on Sky. The channel was initially available through Sky's pay subscription service in a non-exclusive deal, before being added to Virgin Media's service on 14 March 2013. ITV3 HD offers most of the ITV3 catalogue of recent drama in high definition, including Lewis and Agatha Christie's Marple and factual series such as Joanna Lumley's Nile and Martin Clunes' Islands of Britain.

On 1 November 2022, in the lead up to the launch of ITVX and as part of the 18th anniversary of ITV3 and 17th anniversary of ITV4, the encryption was dropped on ITV3 HD at around 11am that day and so became free to air. Later that day, Freesat data had been added to ITV3 HD, indicating that the channel will be made available on Freesat soon. On 8 November 2022 the HD version replaced the SD version on Freesat channel 115.

Branding

2013 rebranding

In line with the corporate rebranding of ITV, ITV3 received a new look on 14 January 2013. The channel was described as the "keeper of ITV's treasured and timeless drama", with a new "midnight blue" logo and idents that feature stories told in shadow-puppet style animation inside glass bell jars.

2022 rebranding 
In line with the launch of the streaming service ITVX, ITV3 received another new look on 15 November 2022. The logo is now coloured purple and uses idents that were cross-used across ITV1, ITV2, ITV4, and ITVBe with different views which reflect the channel's image and programming output.

Viewership and programming

The channel is mainly aimed at the over-35 audience, and its output consists of reruns of older ITV drama series, soap operas and sitcoms.

During the 2007 Rugby World Cup, ITV3 broadcast some of the matches while ITV1 and ITV4 were showing live European football matches which were being played at the same time and in the days when ITV4 was an evenings only service, ITV3 broadcast live weekend coverage of the Tour de France, and more recently, the ITV Racing.

Current programming

 Agatha Christie's Marple
 Agatha Christie's Poirot
 An Audience with...
 Bless This House
 The Bay
 Beecham House 
 Blue Murder
 Classic Coronation Street
 Classic Emmerdale
 Cracker
 The Darling Buds Of May
 DCI Banks
 Doc Martin
 Downton Abbey
 The Durrells
 Emmerdale Omnibus
 Endeavour
 Foyle's War
 George and Mildred
 The Good Karma Hospital
 Grantchester
 Heartbeat
 Inspector Morse
 Inspector Wexford
 Kate & Koji
 Ladies of Letters
 The Larkins
 Law & Order UK
 Lewis
 Little Boy Blue
 The Loch
 Long Lost Family
 Love Your Garden
 Man About the House
 Maigret
 Marcella
 Midsomer Murders
 On the Buses (Series 3–7 only)
 Paul O'Grady's Animal Orphans
 Paul O'Grady: For the Love of Dogs
 Rising Damp
 Road to Avonlea
 Rosemary & Thyme
 The Royal
 The Ruth Rendell Mysteries
 Scott & Bailey
 That's My Boy
 Sunday Night at the London Palladium
 Tonight at the London Palladium
 A Touch of Frost
 Unforgotten
 Upstairs, Downstairs
 Vera
 Victoria
 Where the Heart Is 
 Wild at Heart
 Wire in the Blood
 Wycliffe

Former programming

 Anna Lee
 The Bill 
 Born and Bred 
 Cadfael 
 Clocking Off 
 Crossing Jordan
 Columbo 
 The Commander
 Daily Cooks Challenge
 Dempsey and Makepeace 
 Dragnet
 Dickinson's Real Deal 
 Due South
 Duty Free
 French Fields 
 Fresh Fields  
 Goodnight Sweetheart 
 Grandma Jane's Garden Adventures 
 Home to Roost
 Hornblower 
 The House of Eliott 
 In Loving Memory
 Ironside 
 Kojak 
 The Knock
 The Lakes
 Liverpool 1
 Lovejoy 
 May the Best House Win
 Monarch of the Glen 
 Mr. Bean 
 Murder in Suburbia
 Murder, She Wrote 
 My Wife and Kids
 Never the Twain
 Only When I Laugh 
 Peak Practice 
 Pie in the Sky 
 The Practice
 Prime Suspect
 Quantum Leap
 Rebus 
 Robin of Sherwood 
 Rumpole of the Bailey 
 Second Thoughts
 Sherlock Holmes 
 Space Precinct 
 Taggart 
 Tales of the Unexpected 
 The South Bank Show
 The Two Ronnies  
 Trial and Retribution 
 The Vice
 Whitechapel 
 Who Wants to Be a Millionaire?

Most watched programmes
The following is a list of the ten most watched broadcasts on ITV3 since launch, based on Live +7 data supplied by BARB.

Former logos

References

External links
 

2004 establishments in the United Kingdom
ITV television channels
Television channels and stations established in 2004
Television channels in the United Kingdom